Lisma is a small village in the municipality of Inari that is surrounded by the Lemmenjoki National Park.

References

Villages in Inari, Finland